The Silvester Tournament is a women's FIS World Cup ski jumping competition, established in 2021 in Ljubno ob Savinji, Slovenia, and inspired by the Four Hills Tournament.

The competition is based on a knockout system with 50 contestants divided into 25 pairs. The top 30 advance to the final round consisting of 25 winners and the top 5 lucky losers.

In the first edition, the competition consisted of two events in Slovenia. For the second edition, the Silvester Tournament was expanded to four events in two countries, as Villach joined Ljubno as a co-host.

Tournament

Map of hosts

Overall standings

References

External links 
 

International sports competitions hosted by Slovenia
International sports competitions hosted by Austria
Ski jumping competitions in Austria
Ski jumping competitions in Slovenia
2021 establishments in Slovenia
Recurring sporting events established in 2021
December sporting events
January sporting events

sl:Silvestrska turneja